was a Japanese actor. Hongo won an Elan d'or Award for Newcomer of the Year in 1959. His notable international performances were in the Daiei Studios Gamera films.

Selected filmography

Film

 Geo Tree (1959)

 The Demon of Mount Oe (1960)
 Satan's Sword (1960)
 Satan's Sword II (1960)
 Buddha (1960)
 Satan's Sword 3 (1961)
 Kujira Gami (1962)
 The Great Wall (1962)
 Zero Fighters (1965)
 Gamera vs. Barugon (1966)
 Return of Daimajin (1966)
 Gamera vs. Gyaos (1967)
 The Woman Gambler (1967)
 Gamera vs. Viras (1968)
 Peony Lantern (1968)
 Yokai Monsters: Along with Ghosts (1969)
 Hiken yaburi (1969)
 Lady Sazen and the Drenched Swallow Sword (1969)
 The Falcon Fighters (1969)
 The Haunted Castle (1969)
 Gateway to Glory (1970)
 Karate for Life (1977)
 Gamera: Guardian of the Universe (1995)
 Tokyo Mafia (1995)
 Tokyo Mafia: Wrath of the Yakuza (1996)
 EM Embalming (1999)
 Family (2001)
 Family 2 (2001)

Television
 Tokusō Saizensen (1977-87)
 Takeda Shingen (1988), Amari Torayasu
 Nobunaga: King of Zipangu (1992), Sakuma Morishige
 Homura Tatsu (1993), Hōjō Tokimasa

References

External links

1938 births
2013 deaths
Japanese male film actors
People from Okayama
20th-century Japanese male actors